The Battery "C" 1st Michigan Light Artillery Regiment was an artillery battery that served in the Union Army during the American Civil War.

Service
Battery "C"  was organized at Grand Rapids, Michigan  between  November 23 and December 17, 1861.  The battery was mustered into Federal service on November 28, 1861.

The battery was mustered out on June 22, 1865.

Total strength and casualties
Over its existence, the battery carried a total of 235 men on its muster rolls.

The battery lost 3 enlisted men killed in action or mortally wounded and 34 enlisted men who died of disease, for a total of 37
fatalities.

Commanders
Captain Alexander W. Dees
Captain George Robinson

See also
List of Michigan Civil War Units
Michigan in the American Civil War

Notes

References
The Civil War Archive

Artillery
1865 disestablishments in Michigan
Artillery units and formations of the American Civil War
1861 establishments in Michigan
Military units and formations established in 1861
Military units and formations disestablished in 1865